The Reich Ministry for the Occupied Eastern Territories ( (RMfdbO) or Ostministerium) was created by Adolf Hitler on 17 July 1941 and headed by the Nazi theoretical expert, the Baltic German Alfred Rosenberg.  Alfred Meyer served as Rosenberg's deputy. The German government formed the ministry to control the vast areas captured and projected for capture by the Wehrmacht in Eastern Europe and Russia. The ministry also played a part in supporting anti-Soviet groups in Central Asia.

In February 1942, under Rosenberg's plans, the Ministry tried to promulgate a program of land reform in the occupied territories in the Soviet Union that included promises of decollectivization through the abolition of kolkhozes and the re-distribution of land to peasants for individual farming.

Germany established two Reichskommissariats, for Ostland and Ukraine, and planned for two more, for Muscovy and for the Caucasus. The Wehrmacht never established firm possession of the areas designated for the last two Reichskommissariats and so German civilian control never developed there.

In practice, the appointment of Erich Koch to administer the Reichskommissariat Ukraine substantially undermined Rosenberg's authority. Hitler ordered Koch to take a hard and brutal approach, which helped to push potential Ukrainian allies back to the Allied camp. Rosenberg wished to portray the Germans as liberators of Ukraine from Soviet domination. Furthermore, Rosenberg's ministry was denied authority over army and other security formations within the occupied territories. The other Reich Commissar, Hinrich Lohse (Ostland), was widely disregarded. The SS filled the resulting power vacuum by acting as it wished.

Rank insignia

References

See also

"Decollectivization" under German occupation
Foreign Armies East (Nazi intelligence service focusing on territory to the East)
Gerhard von Mende

Ministries established in 1941
Occupied Eastern Territories